Thavakkara is a small area located in the heart of Kannur City of Kerala, India. There are well known temples, schools, hotels and business firms in Thavakkara. It is located near to Central Railway Station in Kannur. Kannur's Main Municipal Bus Terminal is in Thavakkara.

Thavakkara got its name from Thava. Main Attractions are Muttappan Temple, Royal Omars, Friends Club, Malabar Residence ...dental etc.

References

Suburbs of Kannur